Chilkunda is a village in Mysore district of Karnataka state

Location
Chilkunda is located between Hunsur and Kushalanagar towns on Mysore to Madikeri highway.

Demographics
Chilkunda village has 2,500 inhabitants.

Economy
The economy of the village is mostly agrarian. The major crop is ragi. Tobacco, arecanut, coconut and beetle leaf grow here.

Educational organisations
 Icon International School, Chilkunda
 Government Primary School, Chilkunda

Villages and suburbs
 Hosakoppalu, 1 km
 Habbanakuppe, 3 km
 Makodee, 7 km
 Makode, 7 km
 Thattekere, 8 km
 Abbur, 10 km
 Hitnehebbagilu, 12 km

Festivals
The main festival is ramanavami, Ramzan celebrated for 30 days during the holy month. Ramotsava is celebrated for about 10 days in March and April on behalf of the birthday of Sri Rama. Other festivals celebrated are Ganesh Chaturthi, Deepavali, Sankranti, Ugadi, Shivaratri, and Navaratri.

Temples
 Jamia Masjid Chilkunda
 Masjid e Farukia
 Srivanii village temple
 Srivani amma village temple
 Ishwara temple
 Hanuman temple
 Basaveshwara temple
 Sri Rama mandira

Post office
There is a post office in the village and the postal code is 571105.

References

Villages in Mysore district